The Oldsmobile Aurora Indy V8 engine is a 3.5-liter to 4.0-liter, naturally-aspirated, V-8 Indy car racing engine, designed, developed and produced by Oldsmobile, for use in the IRL IndyCar Series; from 1996 to 2001. It is a variant of the Northstar engine.

A twin-turbocharged version of this engine was used in the Cadillac Northstar LMP sports prototype race car.

Applications

IndyCars
Dallara IR-7
Dallara IR-8
Dallara IR-9
Dallara IR-00
Dallara IR-01
Lola T93/00
Lola T95/00
Reynard 94I
Reynard 95I
G-Force GF01
G-Force GF05

Le Mans Prototypes
Cadillac Northstar LMP

References

Engines by model
Oldsmobile engines
IndyCar Series
V8 engines